Charles Cowan  (7 June 1801 – 1889) was a Scottish politician and paper-maker.

Life
He was born in Charlotte Street in Edinburgh on 7 June 1801, the son of Alexander Cowan, papermaker and philanthropist, and Elizabeth Hall, daughter of George Hall a merchant in Crail in Fife.  He was the eldest of eleven children, eight of whom survived until adulthood. He was educated at Penicuik Parish School 1806-11 and then the High School in Edinburgh. He then attended university both in Edinburgh (1814–17) and Geneva (1817-18).

He then followed his father into the paper-making industry.

He wrote the article on papermaking for the Encyclopædia Britannica. In May 1819, he was sent to learn the papermaking trade at St Mary Cray, Kent, where he worked at either Lay's or Hall's mill on the River Cray.

In the general election of June 1847, he ran as a Radical free-trade candidate in Edinburgh, defeating the incumbent Whig Thomas Babington Macaulay. His initial election was declared null and void due to his being a party to a government contract, but he was re-elected in a second election that December. He was re-elected in the 1852 election in second place on the ballot, and returned unopposed in the 1857 election. He did not stand in 1859, and retired from politics.

In 1863 he was elected a Fellow of the Royal Society of Scotland. He then lived at Mount Grange a large house in the Grange on the south side of Edinburgh.

He died at Wester Lea, a villa in Murrayfield, Edinburgh on 29 March 1889.

Family
He married Catharine Menzies (d.1871) in 1824.

Other accomplishments
 In 1838 he founded the Royal Caledonian Curling Club
 For the year 1864-65 he served as president of the Royal Scottish Society of Arts

References
Notes

External links
 

1801 births
1889 deaths
Scottish Liberal Party MPs
Members of the Parliament of the United Kingdom for Edinburgh constituencies
UK MPs 1847–1852
UK MPs 1852–1857
UK MPs 1857–1859
People from St Mary Cray